Mirella Harju (born 29 September 1982) is a Finnish former racing cyclist. She won the Finnish national road race title in 2008.

References

External links

1982 births
Living people
Finnish female cyclists
Place of birth missing (living people)